"Ella" is a Spanish-language song, a vals mexicano composed by José Alfredo Jiménez in the 40s. Jiménez started to write the song at the age of 18 after a broken romance. The lyrics begin "Me canse de rogarle..".

In 1948, while he was working as waiter in a restaurant called La Sirena, in Santa Maria de la Rivera, he met the singer Miguel Aceves Mejía. He then asked him to hear some of his songs, since he was also a composer. They agreed to meet at the Radio Station XEW, where the singer had an audition called Amanecer Ranchero. A few days later, José Alfredo arrived to the radio and started singing his songs “Ella” and some more. Don Miguel was impressed and promised to support him and record his songs.

Miguel Aceves Mejía was the first famous artist to record Ella, but soon afterwards all major singers in Mexico started to include his songs in their repertory. 

Versions include those by:
 Miguel Aceves Mejía 
 Pedro Infante 
 Jorge Negrete 
 José Alfredo Jiménez 
 Albert Hammond (1971)
 Mario Talavera
 Los Tres De Castilla
 Digno Garcia y Sus Carios 1964
 Roberto Alagna, on the album Pasión
 A virtual duet with Jiménez and Cristian Castro, 1998 (also included on Castro's 2002 compilation album Grandes Hits)

References

1942 songs
Cristian Castro songs
Songs written by José Alfredo Jiménez